The Women competition of the high diving events at the 2022 European Aquatics Championships was held on 18 and 19 August 2022.

It marked the first time a women's high diving event was conducted at a LEN European Aquatics Championships. Competition was contested from a 20 metre platform.

Results
The first two rounds were held on 18 August at 18:00. The last two rounds were started on 19 August at 18:00.

References

High diving Women